Doing His Bit is a 1917 British silent comedy film directed by Edwin J. Collins and starring George Robey and Marjorie Hume andHoward Boddey. It was one of a number of films featuring Robey, one of the leading music hall stars of the era.

Cast
 George Robey - The Man 
 Marjorie Hume - The Girl 
 Howard Boddey

References

Bibliography
 St. Pierre, Paul Matthew. Music Hall Mimesis in British Film, 1895-1960. Associated University Press, 2009.

External links
 

1917 films
British comedy films
British silent short films
Films directed by Edwin J. Collins
Ideal Film Company films
1917 comedy films
British black-and-white films
1910s English-language films
1910s British films
Silent comedy films